Luyang Town is a town and the county seat in the central Rucheng County, Hunan, China. Luyang Town is located in the central portion of Rucheng County, it is bordered by Nuanshui Town and Tuqiao Town to the north, Jiyi Township to the west, Daping Town and Quanshui Town to the south, Maqiao Town to the west. The town has 21 villages and 6 communities under its jurisdiction in 2016, its seat is at Jiulong Avenue.

References

Rucheng
County seats in Hunan
Towns of Chenzhou